Petar Mazev (February 10, 1927 in Kavadarci, Kingdom of Yugoslavia – March 13, 1993 in Skopje, Republic of Macedonia) was a Macedonian academic painter, who is considered one of  the most important postwar painters who introduced new energy into contemporary Macedonian art.

Education and career
He graduated from the Academy of arts in Belgrade in 1953 where he studied under painter Zoran Petrovic. He was professor at the Faculty of Architecture in Skopje. He had held individual exhibitions in the United States, China, India, France, Germany, Italy, Switzerland and other countries. He was a member of the artistic group "Mugri".

Painting Style 
Expressionism was a constant presence in his paintings, but before choosing expressionism, he went through several phases including his White Phase and Warm Phase. In the mid-1960s, Mazev started to include in his non-figurative paintings in muted colours and rendered in dense and grainy impasto with materials such as burnt wooden plates, glass, scrap-metal sheets, and sand. In addition to paintings (mostly oil on canvas), he was also the author of murals, mosaics and ceramic arts.

Paintings

References

External links
ArtFacts - Petar Mazev

1927 births
1993 deaths
People from Kavadarci
Macedonian artists
Macedonian sculptors
20th-century sculptors
20th-century Macedonian painters